Justin Rodriguez (September 4, 1974) is an American politician. He served as a  Democratic member of the Texas House of Representatives from 2013 until January 2019, when he resigned after being appointed to a seat on  the Bexar County Commissioners Court. Rodriguez previously served on the San Antonio City Council, and was a Bexar County prosecutor.

In the race to succeed Representative Rodriguez, Fred Rangel, a member of the Republican State Central Committee for District 26 in the Texas State Senate, and Democrat Ray Lopez, a former member of the San Antonio City Council, met in a March runoff contest. Rangel led Lopez in the February 12 initial balloting as he was the only major Republican, but Lopez won the runoff by consolidating Democratic voters in the heavily Democratic district.

References
https://www.expressnews.com/news/local/amp/Democrat-Lopez-takes-strong-lead-in-early-returns-13683727.php

External links
 
Legislative page

Living people
People from San Antonio
University of the Incarnate Word alumni
University of Wisconsin Law School alumni
Texas lawyers
Democratic Party members of the Texas House of Representatives
Hispanic and Latino American state legislators in Texas
21st-century American politicians
1974 births